The Craving is a 1918 American silent drama film written and directed by John and Francis Ford. A 35mm print of the film with Dutch intertitles survives in the EYE Film Instituut Nederland film archive.

Plot
Carroll Wayles (Ford) is a chemist who has discovered the formula for a high explosive. This is a secret All Kasarib (Gerald) wishes to learn.

He uses his ward, Beulah Grey (Gaston), who is under his hypnotic power, to tempt Wayles with liquor, knowing that he has formerly been addicted to drink, but had overcome it. Wayles returns to his former mode of living. Kasarib gains the ascendency over him and learns the secret. Wayles’ spirit is taken on an imaginary trip over battlegrounds and through scenes of lust to show him the pitfalls that await slaves of the flesh.

Wayles awakens a changed man. He goes to the laboratory of Kasarib, where there is a struggle, during which an explosion kills Kasarib. Wayles and the ward are then free to marry each other.

Cast
 Francis Ford as Carroll Wayles
 Mae Gaston as Beulah Grey
 Peter Gerald as Ala Kasarib
 Duke Worne as Dick Wayles
 Jean Hathaway as Mrs. Wayles

References

External links

1918 films
1918 drama films
1910s rediscovered films
Silent American drama films
American silent feature films
American black-and-white films
Films directed by Francis Ford
Films directed by John Ford
Rediscovered American films
Universal Pictures films
1910s American films